The following list of highest historical junior scores in figure skating contains the highest junior scores earned before the 2018–2019 season under the ISU Judging System (IJS). The 2018–2019 season began on 1 July 2018.

After being trialed in 2003, the IJS replaced the old 6.0 system in the 2004–2005 figure skating season. Up to and including the 2017–2018 season, the Grade of Execution (GOE) scoring system for each program element ranged between –3 and +3. Starting with the 2018–2019 season, the GOE was expanded to range between –5 and +5. Hence, the International Skating Union (ISU) have restarted all records from the 2018–2019 season and all previous statistics have been marked as "historical". Accordingly, this page lists only the highest scores achieved before the 2018–2019 season, using the –3/+3 GOE scoring range.

The following lists are included:
Records: current junior record holders; technical and component record scores; progression of junior record scores
Personal bests: highest personal best scores; highest PB technical element scores; highest PB program component scores
Absolute bests: lists of absolute best scores

Note: In the case of personal best lists, only one score is listed for any one skater, i.e. their personal best. The absolute best lists may include more than one score for the same skater.

The ISU only recognizes the best scores that are set at international competitions run under the ISU's rules, and does not recognize, for example, scores that are obtained at national figure skating championships. The junior competitions recognized by the ISU are: Youth Olympics (including the team event), World Junior Championships, and Junior GP events.

Junior record holders

Men

Ladies

Pairs

Ice dance

Historical ice dance (2003–2010) 
Prior to the 2010–2011 season, ice dance competitions included a compulsory dance and original dance (there was no short dance).

Technical and component record scores 

TES = Technical Element Score
PCS = Program Component Score

Men

Ladies

Pairs

Ice dance

Highest personal best scores 
The following lists include only personal best scores of skaters. To see lists where multiple scores from the same skater are included, see absolute best scores.

Men

Best total scores 

All skaters whose personal best total score is above 222 points are listed here.

Best short program scores 

All skaters whose personal best short program score is above 76 points are listed here.

Best free program scores 

All skaters whose personal best free program score is above 149 points are listed here.

Ladies

Best total scores 

All skaters whose personal best score is above 186 points are listed here.

Best short program scores 

All skaters whose personal best short program score is above 65 points are listed here.

Best free program scores 

All skaters whose personal best free program score is above 123 points are listed here.

Pairs

Best total scores 

All pairs teams whose personal best score is above 159 points are listed here.

Best short program scores 

All pairs teams whose personal best short program score is above 59 points are listed here.

Best free program scores 

All pairs teams whose personal best free program score is above 104 points are listed here.

Ice dance

Best total scores 

All ice dance teams whose personal best total score is above 143 points are listed here.

Best short dance scores 

All ice dance teams whose personal best short dance score is above 61 points are listed here.

Best free dance scores 

All ice dance teams whose personal best free dance score is above 87 points are listed here.

Historical ice dance (2003–2010) 
Prior to the 2010–2011 season, ice dance competitions included a compulsory dance and original dance (there was no short dance).

Best total scores

Best compulsory dance scores

Best original dance scores

Best free dance scores

Absolute best scores 
These lists may include more than one score from an individual skater.

Men

Best total scores 

All junior scores above 230 points are listed here.

Best short program scores 

All junior short program scores above 78 points are listed here.

Best free program scores 

All junior free program scores above 155 points are listed here.

Ladies

Best total scores 

All junior scores above 194 points are listed here.

Best short program scores 

All junior short program scores above 67 points are listed here.

Best free program scores 

All junior free program scores above 127 points are listed here.

Pairs

Best total scores 

All junior scores above 168 points are listed here.

Best short program scores 

All junior short program scores above 60 points are listed here.

Best free program scores 

All junior free program scores above 110 points are listed here.

Ice dance

Best total scores 

All junior scores above 155 points are listed here.

Best short dance scores 
All junior short dance scores above 65 points are listed here.

Best free dance scores 
All junior free dance scores above 92 points are listed here.

Progression of junior record scores

Men

Total score 
Progression of junior men's combined total record score. This list starts from the skater who first scored above 180 points.

Short program score 
Progression of junior men's short program record score. This list starts from the skater who first scored above 65 points.

Free program score 

Progression of junior men's free skating record score. This list starts from the skater who first scored above 120 points.

Ladies

Total score 
Progression of junior ladies' combined total record score. This list starts from the skater who first scored above 160 points.

Short program score 

Progression of junior ladies short program record score. This list starts from the skater who first scored above 55 points.

Free program score 

Progression of junior ladies' free skating record score. This list starts from the skater who first scored above 100 points.

Pairs

Total score 

Progression of junior pairs' combined total record score. This list starts from the pair who scored the highest score in 2004.

Short program score 
Progression of junior pairs' short program record score. This list starts from the pair who scored the highest score in 2004.

Free program score 
Progression of junior pairs' free skating record score. This list starts from the pair who scored the highest score in 2004.

Ice dance

Total score 
Progression of junior ice dance combined total record score. This list starts from the ice dance team who scored the highest score in 2010.

Short dance score 
Progression of junior short dance record score. This list starts from the ice dance team who scored the highest score in 2010.

Free dance score
Progression of junior free dance record score. This list starts from the ice dance team who scored the highest score in 2010.

Historical ice dance (2003–2010) 
Prior to the 2010–2011 season, ice dance competitions included a compulsory dance and original dance (there was no short dance).

Total score 
Progression of junior ice dance combined total record score.

Compulsory dance score 
Progression of junior compulsory dance record score.

Original dance score 
Progression of junior original dance record score.

Free dance score 
Progression of junior free dance record score.

Highest personal best technical element scores 

TES = Technical Element Score

Men 

Short program

Free skating

Ladies 

Short program

Free skating

Pairs 

Short program

Free skating

Ice dance 

Short dance

Free dance

Highest personal best program component scores 

PCS = Program Component Score

Men 

Short program

Free skating

Ladies 

Short program

Free skating

Pairs 

Short program

Free skating

Ice dance 

Short dance

Free dance

Miscellaneous junior records and highest element scores 
GOE = Grade of Execution
BV = Base value

The base value of the element may have changed over time. An 'x' after the base value means that the base value has been multiplied by 1.1 because the jump was executed in the second half of the program.

Men 

Highest valued triple Axels
All scores above 11 points are listed here.

Highest valued quadruples
All scores above 12.50 points are listed here.

Highest valued two jump combos
All scores above 15.50 points are listed here.

Highest valued three jump combos
All scores above 14 points are listed here.

Ladies 

Highest valued triple Axels

Highest valued quadruples

Highest valued two jump combos
All scores above 13 points are listed here.

Highest valued three jump combos
All scores above 13 points are listed here.

Pairs 

Highest valued triple twists
All scores above 8 points are listed here.

Highest valued quadruple twists
All scores above 6.50 points are listed here.

Highest valued quadruple throws
All scores above 7 points are listed here.

Highest valued jump combos
All scores above 7.50 points are listed here.

Highest scores achieved at main international junior events 
The ISU does not officially recognize championships records.

World Junior Championships 

Men 

Ladies 

Pairs 

Ice dance

Winter Youth Olympics 

Men

Ladies

Pairs

Ice dance

Winter Youth Olympics – Team event 

Men

Ladies

Pairs

Ice dance

Junior Grand Prix Final 

Men 

Ladies 

Pairs 

Ice dance

See also 
 List of highest scores in figure skating
 List of highest junior scores in figure skating
 List of highest historical scores in figure skating
 ISU Judging System
 Figure skating records and statistics

References

External links 
 International Skating Union

Figure skating-related lists
Figure skating records and statistics